In geometry, the great dirhombicosidodecahedron (or great snub disicosidisdodecahedron) is a nonconvex uniform polyhedron, indexed last as . It has 124 faces (40 triangles, 60 squares, and 24 pentagrams), 240 edges, and 60 vertices.

This is the only non-degenerate uniform polyhedron with more than six faces meeting at a vertex. Each vertex has 4 squares which pass through the vertex central axis (and thus through the centre of the figure), alternating with two triangles and two pentagrams. Another unusual feature is that the faces all occur in coplanar pairs.

This is also the only uniform polyhedron that cannot be made by the Wythoff construction from a spherical triangle. It has a special Wythoff symbol  relating it to a spherical quadrilateral. This symbol suggests that it is a sort of snub polyhedron, except that instead of the non-snub faces being surrounded by snub triangles as in most snub polyhedra, they are surrounded by snub squares.

It has been nicknamed "Miller's monster" (after J. C. P. Miller, who with H. S. M. Coxeter and M. S. Longuet-Higgins enumerated the uniform polyhedra in 1954).

Related polyhedra 

If the definition of a uniform polyhedron is relaxed to allow any even number of faces adjacent to an edge, then this definition gives rise to one further polyhedron: the great disnub dirhombidodecahedron which has the same vertices and edges but with a different arrangement of triangular faces.

The vertices and edges are also shared with the uniform compounds of 20 octahedra or 20 tetrahemihexahedra. 180 of the 240 edges are shared with the great snub dodecicosidodecahedron.

This polyhedron is related to the nonconvex great rhombicosidodecahedron (quasirhombicosidodecahedron) by a branched cover: there is a function from the great dirhombicosidodecahedron to the quasirhombicosidodecahedron that is 2-to-1 everywhere, except for the vertices.

Cartesian coordinates 
Cartesian coordinates for the vertices of a great dirhombicosidodecahedron are all the even permutations of

 

where τ = (1+)/2 is the golden ratio (sometimes written φ). These vertices result in an edge length of 2.

Gallery

References

 
 Har'El, Z. Uniform Solution for Uniform Polyhedra., Geometriae Dedicata 47, 57-110, 1993. Zvi Har’El, Kaleido software, Images, dual images
  Mäder, R. E. Uniform Polyhedra. Mathematica J. 3, 48-57, 1993.

External links 
 
 http://www.mathconsult.ch/showroom/unipoly/75.html
 http://www.software3d.com/MillersMonster.php

Uniform polyhedra